On March 5, 1963, American country music performers Patsy Cline, Cowboy Copas, and Hawkshaw Hawkins were killed in an airplane crash near Camden, Tennessee, United States, along with the pilot Randy Hughes. The accident occurred as the three artists were returning home to Nashville, Tennessee, after performing in Kansas City, Kansas.

Shortly after takeoff from a refueling stop, pilot Hughes lost control of the small Piper PA-24 Comanche while flying in low-visibility conditions, and subsequently crashed into a wooded area, leaving no survivors. Investigators concluded that the crash was caused by the non-instrument-rated pilot's decision to operate under visual flight rules in instrument meteorological conditions.

Accident
Around 2 pm on Tuesday, March 5, 1963, the Piper Comanche, piloted by Randy Hughes, departed Fairfax Municipal Airport in Kansas City, Kansas. It was operating as an unscheduled cross-country passenger flight under visual flight rules (VFR) to its destination of Nashville,  to the southeast. Later that afternoon, the aircraft landed to refuel at Rogers Municipal Airport in Rogers, Arkansas, and departed 15 minutes later.

Hughes later made contact with Dyersburg Regional Airport in Dyersburg, Tennessee, and landed there at 5:05 pm, where he requested a weather briefing for the remainder of the flight to Nashville. He was informed by Federal Aviation Administration (FAA) employee Leroy Neal that local conditions were marginal for VFR flight and weather at the destination airport was below VFR minima. Hughes then asked if the Dyersburg runways were lit at night in case he had to return and Neal replied that they were. Hughes then informed Neal he would fly east towards the Tennessee River and navigate to Nashville from there, as he was familiar with the terrain in that area.

After refueling, the passengers and pilot reboarded the Piper Comanche. Hughes requested another weather briefing by radio, then taxied into position and took off at 6:07 pm. After takeoff, no further radio contact was made with N7000P. The engine noise increased and seconds later a white light appeared from the overcast, descending in a 45° angle.

The aircraft was destroyed on impact and all four occupants were killed. The witness described hearing a dull-sounding crash, followed by complete silence.

Aircraft and crew
Registered as  the aircraft was a three-year-old PA-24-250 Comanche four-seat, light, single-engined airplane manufactured in 1960 by Piper Aircraft. Serial Number 24-2144 was equipped with a Lycoming O-540-A1D5  normally aspirated engine, turning a constant-speed propeller. The aircraft had passed its last FAA inspection on 19 April 1962.

The owner and pilot of the aircraft, Ramsey (Randy) Dorris Hughes, 34, was also Patsy Cline's manager and the son-in-law of Cowboy Copas. Hughes held a valid private pilot certificate with an airplane single-engined land rating, but was not rated to fly under instrument flight rules. Hughes had taken possession of the airplane in 1962, less than a year before the crash, and was an inexperienced pilot with a total flight time of 160.2 hours, including 44:25 logged in the Piper Comanche.

Aftermath and investigation
After the witness notified the Tennessee Highway Patrol, two law enforcement officers performed a preliminary search of the area around 7 pm, but they found nothing. By 11:30 pm, a search party was organized consisting of the Highway Patrol, Civil Defense, and local officers who searched the area throughout the night. At 6:10 am on March 6, the wreckage was discovered.

The right wing then collided with another tree  to the right, causing the airplane to become inverted.

Inspection of the airframe and engine disclosed that the aircraft was intact and the engine was developing substantial power before impacting the trees. Investigators found no evidence of engine or system failure or malfunction of the aircraft prior to the crash. The airplane was determined to be slightly over maximum gross weight when it departed Dyersburg airport, but this fact had no bearing on the crash. An autopsy of the pilot discovered no physical or medical concerns that could have been a factor in the accident.

Investigators believe that Hughes entered an area of deteriorating weather with low visibility and lost his visual reference with the ground. This induced spatial disorientation, and eventually led to a graveyard spiral with the aircraft entering into a right-hand diving turn, with a nose-down attitude of 25°. When the aircraft cleared the clouds, Hughes attempted to arrest the high descent rate by pulling the nose up and applying full power, but it was too late. The FAA investigators later found evidence that the propeller was at maximum speed during impact.

The FAA's final conclusion was the non-instrument-rated pilot attempted visual flight in adverse weather conditions, resulting in disorientation and subsequent loss of control.

See also 

 1959 The Day the Music Died
 1969 Newton Cessna 172 crash
 1971 Colorado Aviation Aero Commander 680 crash
 1972 Puerto Rico DC-7 crash 
 1977 Mississippi CV-240 crash
 1999 John F. Kennedy Jr. plane crash

References

External links
 

1963 in Tennessee
Aviation accidents and incidents caused by pilot error
Aviation accidents and incidents in 1963
Aviation accidents and incidents in Tennessee
Benton County, Tennessee
March 1963 events in the United States